NGC 225 is an open cluster in the constellation Cassiopeia. It is located roughly 2,200 light-years from Earth. It is about 100 to 150 million years old.

The binary fraction, or the fraction of stars that are multiple stars, is 0.52.

At the 2022 Eldorado Star Party amateur astronomer Will Young, a member of the Astronomical Society of South East Texas, dubbed this open cluster to feature the “Halloween Cat” asterism. A subgroup of brighter stars in this cluster appear to delineate a cat with forward facing eyes, arched back, and raised tail.

See also 
 Open cluster 
 List of NGC objects (1–1000)
 Cassiopeia (constellation)

References

External links 
 
 
 SEDS

Open clusters
Cassiopeia (constellation)
0225
17830927